Uncle Buck is an American comedy franchise that consists of one film and two television series. The series tells the story of the titular "Uncle Buck" Russell, a bachelor and all-around-slob who babysits his brother's rebellious teenage daughter and her younger brother and sister. Starring John Candy, Kevin Meaney and Mike Epps, the series also co-stars Amy Madigan, Macaulay Culkin, Lacey Chabert and Nia Long.

Films

Uncle Buck (1989)

Uncle Buck marked the first film directed, written and produced by John Hughes under a multi-picture agreement deal with Universal Studios, starring John Candy and Amy Madigan. Hughes later suggested to Chris Columbus that they cast Macaulay Culkin as Kevin McCallister in Home Alone because of his experience while shooting Uncle Buck, which also featured Candy.

Television

Uncle Buck (1990–1991)

A television series was broadcast on CBS in 1990. It starred Kevin Meaney as Buck, a slob who drinks and smokes. When Bob and Cindy die in a car accident, he is named as the guardian of Tia, Miles, and Maizy. Opening to negative critical ratings, after it was moved to Friday, in an attempt by CBS to establish a comedy night there, its ratings quickly plummeted and it was canceled.

Uncle Buck (2016)

In June 2016 ABC premiered a second television adaptation featuring an African-American cast with Mike Epps in the title role, James Lesure as his brother, and Nia Long as Buck's sister-in-law. It suffered a similar fate as the previous TV adaptation, as it was poorly received by critics and then cancelled after only eight episodes.

Cast and characters

See also
 Home Alone, a 1990 film also written by John Hughes, starring Macaulay Culkin and featuring John Candy

References

External links
  
  (1989)
  (1989)
  (1990)
 
 

American film series